The Belle Chasse Tunnel was built starting in March 1954 to accommodate the new branch of the Intracoastal Canal.  After nearly two years of construction, the $2,436,000 structure opened in February 1956 with the Canal beginning operations later that year.  The politicians in Plaquemines Parish chose to construct a tunnel as opposed to a drawbridge as to enable continuous flow of traffic.  According to engineers and various 1956 issues of the Plaquemines Gazette, the tunnel is the first fully automatic underwater tunnel in the world as it did not require any operating personnel.  The tunnel has ventilation machinery that automatically change the tunnel's air every two minutes with automatic generators taking over if the machinery fails.

Judge Leander Perez enabled the tunnel's construction by passing a constitutional amendment through the Plaquemines Parish Police Jury.  He sold bonds towards construction with the US Corps of Engineers paying the remainder of the construction fees.  When the tunnel opened, it was the first underwater tunnel in Louisiana.  Shortly after, two new tunnels were built in the state: the Harvey Tunnel which once carried traffic from the Westbank Expressway and the Houma Tunnel.

The tunnel was the primary means of carrying traffic to and from Belle Chasse and westbank Plaquemines Parish.  Since its opening, hazardous cargo is prohibited from travelling through the tunnel, and numerous additional regulations/restrictions have been enforced.  Traffic counts soon overwhelmed the tunnel, and in 1967, construction of the Judge Perez Bridge, a vertical-lift bridge, commenced, and that structure opened in 1968 to serve northbound traffic and, whenever the tunnel is closed for maintenance, southbound traffic.

Today, the tunnel is still heavily used by commuters to and from New Orleans and surrounding areas.  It sports a solid white line that prohibits passing inside the structure.  It also experiences flooding problems fairly often and was one of many structures closed after Hurricane Katrina.  There have been plans for replacing the tunnel and lift bridge with new and improved high-rise structures, and construction has since started to build a bridge that will replace them.

See also
LA-23
Judge Perez Bridge
Westbank Expressay
Harvey Tunnel
Belle Chasse
Plaquemines Parish

References

Buildings and structures in Plaquemines Parish, Louisiana
Tunnels in Louisiana
Roads in Louisiana
Transportation in the New Orleans metropolitan area
Intracoastal Waterway
Great River Road
Tunnels completed in 1956
Transportation in Plaquemines Parish, Louisiana
Road tunnels in the United States